ABC has been airing college football since acquiring the NCAA contract in 1966. Chris Schenkel and Bud Wilkinson were the number one broadcast team through 1973. Keith Jackson, its best-known college football play-by-play man, announced games from 1966 through 2005 on ABC (and for 14 years before that for various outlets), and was considered by many to be "the voice of college football." Jackson was ABC's lead play-by play man for 25 years, from 1974 through 1998.  He originally was to retire after the 1999 Fiesta Bowl, but agreed to remain on a more restricted schedule (primarily broadcasting West Coast games) and remained with ABC through the 2006 Rose Bowl.

Major bowl games

From 1999 to 2006 (1998-2005 seasons), all games of the Bowl Championship Series were televised by ABC Sports. Generally, coverage consisted of two games on New Year's Day, one on January 2, and one on either January 3 or 4. ABC paid nearly $25 million per year for the broadcast rights to the Fiesta, Sugar and Orange bowls during that time. Overall, the contract was worth $550 million over the eight years for all the bowl games.

Starting with the 2006 season, coverage would be split between ABC and Fox. Fox paid for each bowl game US$20 million. Four of the BCS bowl games were on FOX: the Orange Bowl, Sugar Bowl, Fiesta Bowl, and a new fifth game, the BCS National Championship Game. ABC will continue to broadcast the Rose Bowl Game. ABC had a $300 million eight-year contract that extends to 2014 for the broadcast rights for the Rose Bowl.

In 2007, ABC and Fox showed one game each on January 1, Fox then showed one game each on January 2 and 3 and came back with the championship game on January 8. A similar schedule is planned for future years.

Fox showed all BCS championship games the first three years of the contract, while in 2010 the Rose Bowl stadium was the location of the BCS Championship game, and ABC televised it.

Fiesta Bowl

From 1999 to 2006, the game aired on ABC as part of the first BCS package.

Orange Bowl

ABC held the rights to the event from 1962 to 1964 and again from 1999 to 2006.

Peach Bowl

Rose Bowl

From 1989 to 2010, the game was broadcast on ABC, usually at 2 p.m. PST; the 2005 edition was the first one broadcast in HDTV. Beginning in 2007, FOX had the broadcast rights to the other Bowl Championship Series games, but the Rose Bowl, which negotiates its own television contract independent of the BCS, had agreed to keep the game on ABC.

Beginning with the 2010 season, ESPN (majority-owned by ABC's parent company, The Walt Disney Company) now broadcasts all the BCS/CFP games, including the Rose Bowl game.

Sugar Bowl

From 1999 to 2006, the game aired on ABC as part of its BCS package, where it had also been televised from 1969 through 1998. The Sugar Bowl was the only Bowl Alliance game to stick with ABC following the 1995, 1996 and 1997 seasons; the Fiesta and Orange Bowls were televised by CBS.

Other bowl games

Citrus Bowl

The bowl has been broadcast by Mizlou (1976–1983), NBC (1984–1985), and ABC since then, with the exception of ESPN for the 2011 and 2012 editions.

Gator Bowl

Las Vegas Bowl

The Las Vegas Bowl has been televised by ABC since 2013; ABC also televised the game in 2001. Other editions of the game were broadcast by ESPN or ESPN2.

Liberty Bowl

Since 1990, the game has been broadcast predominantly by ESPN, with some editions on ABC.

See also
CBS college bowl game broadcasts
Fox college bowl game broadcasts
NBC college bowl game broadcasts

References

External links
Fiesta Bowl Numbers Game
Orange Bowl Numbers Game - Sports Media Watch
Rose Bowl Numbers Game
ABC College Football announce teams intact

American Broadcasting Company original programming
Lists of college football bowl broadcasters
Sports telecast series
College football television series
College bowl games broadcasts